The South Dakota Department of Corrections is the agency that operates state prisons in the US state of South Dakota. It has its headquarters in Pierre.

Adult prisons

 Mike Durfee State Prison
 South Dakota State Penitentiary and its Jameson Annex
 South Dakota Women's Prison (inmate capacity 452)
 Rapid City Trustee Unit
 Yankton Trustee Unit

Juvenile corrections
The South Dakota corrections system includes the Juvenile Corrections System, its network of juvenile facilities.

STAR Evergreen High School serves as the middle and high school for delinquent youth. The STAR campus includes several units. The STAR Admissions Unit processes new arrivals. The Youth Challenge Center and the Patrick H. Brady Academy serve young men. The QUEST and Excel programs serve young women.

The West Farm in unincorporated Minnehaha County, near Sioux Falls, serves as the juvenile transitional care facility for boys who are about to go back into their communities. 
STAR Academy and Patrick H Brady Academy closed in April 2016.  All juveniles are housed in private placements supervised by Juvenile Community Corrections staff.

Prison gang activity
Over the ten years leading to 2010, prison staff identified approximately 150 different gangs in South Dakota's state prisons. Of those, eight are currently active at the South Dakota State Penitentiary in Sioux Falls. Most have racial allegiances, like the Gangster Disciples, an African American street gang; and the Sureños, a Hispanic street gang. Warden Doug Weber told KSFY-TV that two gangs actually formed at the South Dakota State Penitentiary: the Family Brotherhood is an Aryan gang and the Red Brotherhood is a Native American gang.

See also
 List of law enforcement agencies in South Dakota
 List of United States state correction agencies
 List of U.S. state prisons

References

External links
South Dakota Department of Corrections

State law enforcement agencies of South Dakota
Prisons in South Dakota
Lists of United States state prisons
Juvenile detention centers in the United States
State corrections departments of the United States
1989 establishments in South Dakota
Government agencies established in 1989